Samuel Parkes VC (probably late 1815 – 15 November 1864) was an English recipient of the Victoria Cross, the highest and most prestigious award for gallantry in the face of the enemy that can be awarded to British and Commonwealth forces. Parkes was awarded his VC for his actions during the Charge of the Light Brigade.

Details
Born in Wigginton, Tamworth, Staffordshire probably in late 1815, he was baptised at the Church of St Editha, Tamworth on 24 December 1815, the son of Thomas Parks/Parkes and Lydia Fearn/Fern/Fearns; no exact date of birth has been established. Within the family, it is said that he was known as "George". He had two sisters, Elizabeth (baptised 1812) and Mary (baptised 1819); no other siblings are recorded in St Editha's baptismal register.

He died on 14 November 1864 at Stanhope Lodge, Hyde Park, London. He was buried in Brompton Cemetery, London in an unmarked pauper's grave (no. 39265, reference R80'6" x 109' 3") on 19 November 1864 after a funeral at St George's, Hanover Square. A memorial stone was placed on his grave in May 1999, thanks to the efforts of Peter Elkin, and a plaque was placed in Tamworth parish church on Balaklava Day 2004. A new memorial was unveiled in the village of his birth on 14 September 2011 following a fund-raising campaign by the people of Wigginton.

According to the Army, he was born in 1813. His own declaration on enlistment declares his age as 18 years old while his discharge papers state precisely that he was 44 years 3 months (i.e. he was born in August or September 1813). His death certificate and the Brompton Cemetery burial register both say, however, that he was aged 49 at death, in which case he was born in 1815. The years around 1830 were a time of agricultural depression in England so, like many before and since, the 16-year-old lad might have lied about his age to enlist in a secure job with reasonable pay. Furthermore, birth and baptism usually followed each other rapidly at that time. On balance, 1815 would seem to be the more likely year of his birth.

Early career
Described as a labourer, he enlisted in the 4th Queens Own Light Dragoons on 30 July 1831 and was discharged on 1 December 1857 with four good conduct badges, as an out-pensioner of Chelsea Hospital. He served 11 years with the 4th Light Dragoons in India, including the First Afghan War (Ghunzee medal), and in the Crimean War. Peacetime service with the 4th saw Parkes in Wales and Ireland as well as in England. At Balaklava, he was serving as an orderly to the regimental commanding officer, Colonel Lord George Paget.

Parkes' discharge papers show a chequered military career. He earned four good conduct badges, but he won and lost the first badge five times between 1838 and 1850 (i.e. covering his entire service in India and more). He gained the second only in January 1852 and then lost it the same year, regaining it in 1853. He then managed to gain a third in November 1855 and was awarded the fourth only on 18 November 1857 (four days after his discharge Board). In addition, he was sentenced to 56 days imprisonment in Galway Gaol in 1848 by a district court martial in Ireland. Parkes was confined on 9 November 1848, convicted on 21 November 1848 and released on 15 January 1849 – so in addition to his 56-day sentence he was in prison for 11 days before conviction. The offence itself is not specified in the Regimental Muster Roll. Neither is it mentioned in Parkes' discharge papers. But papers catalogued in The National Archives as WO 86/6 show that he was found guilty of being 'drunk on duty' and was one of three privates from his regiment so convicted on the same day – one also received 56 days but the other was sentenced to 70 days. This blemished record explains why Parkes was not awarded the Army Long Service and Good Conduct Medal, which for the cavalry then required 20 years of irreproachable character.

Crimea
Parkes thus remained a Private in the 4th Light Dragoons (from 1861, the 4th Hussars - The Queen's Own) throughout his career. He won his VC on 25 October 1854 in the Charge of the Light Brigade during the Battle of Balaklava during the Crimean War, when the following deed took place for which he was awarded the VC:

On 25 October 1854 at Balaclava, Crimean Peninsula, (Charge of the Light Brigade)

The VC citation refers to Hugh Crawford as being a Trumpet Major, but he was not promoted to that rank until 1 December 1855.

Elkin claims to own the sword which Parkes carried at Balaklava. The sword may have belonged to Parkes at some point in his military career, but it cannot be the one that he used on 25 October 1854 at Balaklava because the VC citation clearly states that Parkes was "deprived of his sword with a shot" and then taken prisoner. What is more, the 4th Light Dragoons had not at that point been equipped with the 1853 pattern light cavalry sabre. Parkes won his VC that day armed with an 1829 pattern light cavalry.

Parkes and Crawford were held as Russian prisoners until 26 October 1855 - which makes Parkes the very first prisoner of war VC. Joseph Grigg, who charged with the 4th Light Dragoons at Balaklava, in his article "The Charge of the Six Hundred" reports that "Parks told us that he and some others were taken to St. Petersburg, where they were well treated, and allowed eight pence a day each for food, which was very cheap."

Later life
On leaving the army after 26 years 58 days reckonable service (i.e. excluding the period in gaol in 1848), he was appointed a warder at Hampton Court, with a pension of 1/1d as an out-pensioner of Chelsea Hospital. He subsequently became the Inspector of the Park Constables in Hyde Park. At one time he worked out of the constables' station inside Marble Arch.

He married Ann Jeffrey on 13 February 1858 at St George's, Hanover Square, London; their marriage certificate records that both were then living in Oxford Street. They had no children. As far as is known, he had not been married before.

Parkes was one of a number of Light Brigade survivors who in the spring of 1863 swore an affidavit in the celebrated libel case of Cardigan v Calthorpe. His evidence was one of 15 affidavits collected by Calthorpe, the defendant.

His discharge papers describe him as 6 ft 2 ins tall with a "fair" complexion, grey eyes and "light" hair.

Parkes was the oldest man to win the VC in the Crimean War and is the VC with the earliest campaign medal (Ghuznee 1839).

His death certificate records that he died of apoplexy. Buried in Brompton Cemetery

Medals
Parkes' Victoria Cross and other medals were once displayed by his regiment but are now in the Lord Ashcroft collection. The painting of his VC action by Chevalier Desanges is in the regimental museum. In total he was awarded four medals: the Victoria Cross, the Ghuznee Medal, the British Crimean Medal with three clasps (Alma, Balaklava, Sebastopol) and the Turkish Crimean Medal (British variety).

The VC was bought at auction by the officers of the 4th Hussars and presented to the regiment on Balaklava Day 1954 to mark the centenary of the battle. There was once a second VC awarded to Parkes, a replacement following the "loss" (sale by him?) of his original. Bought at Sotheby's on 21 December 1879 (lot 275) for £1-12s-0d by Viscount Dillon, he presented it to the Royal United Service Institute Museum c.1920. The subsequent story of his medals is itself complex. At what date either Parkes, or his family, lost or sold his medals is unknown - although in his regiment the story is that one evening, finding himself without money, he used his VC to pay for several pints of beer. The original VC presented by Queen Victoria in 1857 turned up in 1940 when it was sold in London. It was sold again in 1953 to an anonymous benefactor of the Royal Norfolk Regiment, together with Parkes' Ghuznee medal. He gave them both to their Museum but the Norfolks returned them so that they could be offered to the 4th Hussars - whose officers bought them at auction. As for the duplicate, the RUSI Museum catalogue (1924 edition), states "Experts have been consulted, but they are unable to say which, on comparing them, is the genuine one." On the closure of that Museum in 1963, it was given to the Museum of the Green Howards as a copy with instructions that when they no longer wanted it, it was to be destroyed; claims that they subsequently did this are not correct, as the replica is known to exist in a private collection.

Both Crimean medals (without the Ghuznee medal or a VC, real or copy), were sold at Sotheby's (part of lot 110), for £3-18s-0d on 21 June 1906 - in a sale at which the Crimean campaign medals of another four Light Brigade men were also sold. Both were sold again at Glendinings (lot 16), on 12 March 1907, for £2-8s-0d and reappeared in their sale rooms twice more, on both occasions with a copy of a VC: on 27 March 1914 (lot 246), when they made £6-15s-0d and on 23 January 1920 (lot 304) when they went for £3-7s-6d. These are presumably the two Crimean medals that in the mid-1950s were somehow reunited with Parkes' Ghuznee medal and his VC and sold to the 4th Hussars. But a second British Crimean campaign medal with three bars named to Parkes exists - it was shown to Sotheby's and verified by them as genuine in 1972/73.

The 4th Light Dragoons' regimental returns in the Crimean Medal Roll [PRO, WO 100/24] show Parkes' entitlement to the clasp for Alma (at f.203 recto) while there is a dash against Inkerman, noting he had been taken prisoner on 25 October. His entitlement to the Balaklava bar is recorded on folio 228 recto. But his name does not appear in the list of those entitled to the Sebastopol clasp (folios 216 recto to 225 recto) - though this was an automatic award for those who had been at Inkermann and/or Balaklava.

Pictures

No photograph of Samuel Parkes is known to exist (unless, by sheer chance, he is one of the privates of the 4th Light Dragoons who appear in a photograph taken at the Cavalry Barracks at Brighton c.1853-54, illustrated in Wilkinson-Latham, no.27 p. 35).

The oil painting by the Chevalier Louis Desanges may be a fair and genuine likeness. Between 1857 and 1862, Desanges painted 50 VC winners. Of those, some 23 were Crimean VC winners, but only four of those depicted in the series were rankers. Depicting acts of saving the lives of other soldiers is the common thread explaining why these individual VC winners were picked out for commemoration in the series of paintings, but Samuel Parkes is the only one of the entire 50 to illustrate a ranker saving another ranker, as opposed to a ranker saving an officer. The set of VC paintings were displayed at the Crystal Palace from 1862 to c.1880. They were then bought by Lord Wantage VC who presented them to the Wantage town council in 1900. Later, the collection was dispersed, many being bought by regimental museums. The portraits were widely reproduced as postcards and photographs. The Desanges portrait is reproduced in M. Barthorp, "Heroes of the Crimea. The Battles of Balaklava & Inkerman." (Blandford, London, 1991), p. 132 and in colour in Elkin, "Tamworth's Forgotten Hero.", p. 145.

Parkes also appears in the watercolour 'The Queen distributing the first Victoria Crosses in Hyde Park, 26 June 1857' by G H Thomas that is in the British royal collection. Not much of him can be seen at the very far left, but he is shown (correctly) wearing the newly introduced dragoon uniform. This painting is reproduced in Elkin, "Tamworth's Forgotten Hero.", p. 44.

VC winners were a popular subject for postcards and cigarette cards, but none showing Parkes is accurate, e.g. a John Player & Sons cigarette card from their 1914 series 'Victoria Cross' (card no.5) shows him winning his VC still mounted on his horse. The coloured Raphael Tuck oilette postcard (number 9247; artist = H. Montague Love, 1905) in their series 'How he won the Victoria Cross' is an even more fanciful depiction of Parkes, showing him dressed in the uniform of a hussar and saving a lancer. This card is reproduced in Elkin, "Tamworth's Forgotten Hero.", p. 143. At least Valentine's "Artotype" series 'The King's Army, 1854' (artist R. Stewart) showed the 4th at Balaklava dressed correctly as dragoons with the right regimental facings, even if the caption called them the 4th Hussars.

References

Primary

 Crimean Medal Roll, 4th Light Dragoons: The National Archives, catalogue reference , ff.203r, 228r.
 Parkes' discharge papers are held by The National Archives, catalogue ref, WO 97/1296.
 S. Calthorpe, "Cardigan v Calthorpe: Affidavits filed by the Respondent." (John Murray, London, 1863), p. 31.
 Joseph Grigg, "The Charge of the Six Hundred.", in ed. E Milton Small, "Told From the Ranks. Recollections of Service by Privates and Non-Commissioned Officers of the British Army 1843-1901." (London, 1901), p. 69.
 Lord George Paget, "The Light Cavalry Brigade in the Crimea." (John Murray, London, 1881), pp. 71, 163, 183, 199.

Secondary

 Peter Elkin, "Tamworth's Forgotten Hero. Samuel Parkes VC." (Wonderworks Studios, Nantwich, 2004) .
 Martin D. W. Jones, "Policemen & the Charge of the Light Brigade.", Journal of the Police History Society, IV (1989).
 W. M. Lummis & K. G. Wynn, "Honour the Light Brigade." (Hayward & Sons, London, 1973), p. 58. [NB Not every detail here is correct].
 John & Boris Mollo, "Uniforms & Equipment of the Light Brigade." (Historical Research Unit, London, 1968), pp. 19 [drawing by General Vanson made 29 October 1854 of a 4th LD private armed with an 1829-pattern sabre], 54.
 John & Boris Mollo, "Into the Valley of Death. The British Cavalry Division at Balaklava 1854." (Windrowe & Greene, London, 1994), pp. 106–109.
 Robert Wilkinson-Latham, "Uniforms & Weapons of the Crimean War." (Batsford, London, 1977), pp. 35, 92.

External links
Location of grave and VC medal (Brompton Cemetery)
Website linked to Elkin's book on Parkes
EJ Boys Archive: Charge of the Light Brigade website, entry for Parkes.

1810s births
1864 deaths
British military personnel of the First Anglo-Afghan War
British Army personnel of the Crimean War
Crimean War recipients of the Victoria Cross
British recipients of the Victoria Cross
4th Queen's Own Hussars soldiers
Burials at Brompton Cemetery
British prisoners of war of the Crimean War
People from Wigginton, Staffordshire
British Army recipients of the Victoria Cross
Officers in English police forces
Chelsea Pensioners